The 2009 Canoe Slalom World Cup was a series of five races in 4 canoeing and kayaking categories organized by the International Canoe Federation (ICF). It was the 22nd edition. The series consisted of 2 continental championships (Oceania and Pan American) which were open to all countries and 3 world cup races. The athletes gained points for their results in the three world cup races plus their best result from any of the two continental championships. The women's single canoe appeared for the first time at the world cups and was an exhibition event.

Calendar

Final standings 

The winner of each race was awarded 50 points. Paddlers outside the top 20 in any event were awarded 2 points for participation. If two or more athletes or boats were equal on points, the ranking was determined by their positions in the final world cup race (World Cup Race 3).

Results

Oceania Championships 2009 

The 2009 Oceania Championships took place in Mangahao, New Zealand from January 31 to February 1. The C2 event was not held here. Three countries won 1 gold each. New Zealand paddlers managed to take 1 silver and 2 bronze medals.

World Cup Race 1 

The first world cup race of 2009 was held in Pau, France on June 27–28. Home paddlers took 1 gold, 2 silvers and 1 bronze to win the medal table.

World Cup Race 2 

The series continued in Bratislava, Slovakia on July 4–5. Slovak paddlers won 3 out of 4 medal events and added 2 silvers and 2 bronzes to win the medal table.

World Cup Race 3 

The race in Augsburg, Germany, held on July 10–12, was the final regular world cup race of the season. Germany won the medal table with 1 gold, 2 silvers and 2 bronzes.

2009 Pan American Championships 

The 2009 Pan American Championships were held in Kananaskis, Canada on August 2–3. Canada was the most successful country with 2 golds and 2 bronzes.

References

External links 
 International Canoe Federation

Canoe Slalom World Cup
Canoe Slalom World Cup